Dave Fennoy is an American voice actor. His video game roles have included Lee Everett in The Walking Dead, Bluebeard in The Wolf Among Us, Finch in Tales from the Borderlands, Gabriel the Warrior in Minecraft: Story Mode, and Lucius Fox in Batman: Arkham Knight and Batman: The Telltale Series. He also voiced "JP Dumund" in the Vendettas mode in The Darkness 2, as well as Satan in Afterparty.

Early life
Fennoy was born in Silver Spring, Maryland and then moved to Cleveland, Ohio. He was a child actor at the Karamu House in Cleveland. In his senior year of high school, he was president of the theater club and directed as well as performed in several plays, before attending Macalester College in St Paul Minnesota as a theater major. Fennoy left college when he began touring as a professional musician. He later returned and graduated from Howard University with a degree in jazz studies and a guitar minor.

Career

Fennoy started as a DJ in the San Francisco bay area when he first became interested in voiceover work. He created a demo tape, which was seen by Joan Spangler, a talent agent in San Francisco, who signed him. He booked his first audition, a spot for the California Lottery; however, after quick success, things slowed down to a near halt. He began taking voiceover classes to remedy the situation. In 1989, an agent by the name of Leigh Gilbert invited Fennoy to sign with her agency in Los Angeles. He turned the offer down, as he was the morning DJ at local radio station KSOL at the time.

In February 1990, the radio station fired Fennoy, so he contacted Gilbert and moved to Los Angeles. Once there, he quickly found himself voicing commercials, television promos and cartoons. One of his first jobs was as the voice of RoboCop in a telephonic RoboCop game. In 1990, he voiced his first character in an animated series, Dick Scott in New Kids on the Block. The following year, he voiced Bo Jackson in ProStars. In 2008, Fennoy began doing the five second voice-overs in the beginning of Hulu video clips. ("The following program is brought to you with limited commercial interruption by...")

One of his most notable roles, if not the most notable, has been that of Lee Everett in The Walking Dead by Telltale Games.

Personal life

Fennoy lives with his wife, Monique. He used to lend his voice to radio until it was suggested to him by a colleague that he should attempt to pursue work as a voice actor. He has since made a homemade voice acting studio in the basement of his house.

Filmography

Animation

Film

Video games

Live-action

References

External links
 
 
 Interview with Dave Fennoy

Living people
American male film actors
American male television actors
American male video game actors
American male voice actors
American radio DJs
African-American male actors
20th-century American male actors
21st-century American male actors
20th-century African-American people
21st-century African-American people
Year of birth missing (living people)